The Calendar is a black and white 1948 British drama film directed by Arthur Crabtree and starring Greta Gynt, John McCallum, Raymond Lovell and Leslie Dwyer. It is based on the 1929 play The Calendar and subsequent novel by Edgar Wallace. A previous version had been released in 1931.

Plot
Garry is a racehorse owner. After he loses money at the races, his fiancee Wenda jilts him and marries Lord Willis Panniford, whose sister Molly trains Garry's horses.

Whilst drowning his sorrows, Garry becomes involved in a big-race scandal. The plot is to steal his own prize horse before a race, therefore increasing the odds in another big upcoming race, the Ascot Gold Cup.

Stewards run an inquiry into the running of Garry's horse. Wenda is called as a witness. She denies that Garry's first telegram telling her not to back his horse was cancelled out by another message from him, which was sent before the race.

Molly knows that Garry stopped the dishonest running plan. She gets Garry's second note that he had originally sent to Wenda, and shows it to the stewards just before the running of the Gold Cup race.

Garry is cleared of all charges.

Cast
 Greta Gynt as Wenda Panniford
 John McCallum as Captain Garry Anson
 Raymond Lovell as Lord Willie Panniford
 Sonia Holm as Lady Mollie Panniford
 Leslie Dwyer as Sam Hillcott
 Charles Victor as John Dory
 Felix Aylmer as Lord Forlingham
 Diana Dors as Hawkins
 Cyril Chamberlain as Customs Official
  Sidney King as Tony
 Noel Howlett as Lawyer
 Barry Jones as Sir John Garth
 Claude Bailey as Lord Inspond
 Desmond Roberts as Rainby
 Fred Payne as Andy Lynn

Production
The Calendar had been a popular novel and play which was previously filmed in 1931. Sydney Box decided on a remake as part of his slate of movies at Gainsborough Studios.

In June 1947, Gainsborough announced that the film would feature the comedy team of Basil Radford and Naunton Wayne. Neither actor appears in the final movie. The film was to be one of two movies about horse racing made by Gainsborough the other being Becher's Brook. The films were scheduled to be directed by Maurice Elvey but he was fired by Gainsborough's head of production Sydney Box and replaced by Arthur Crabtree.

It was an early lead role for Australian actor John McCallum who had been in The Loves of Joanna Godden. Filming took place in October 1947. It was mostly shot at Shepherd's Bush studios in London. There was location filming at Ascot and Hurst Park. It was the first time royal permission was given to film on the royal course.

Reception
David Parkinson, in the Radio Times, wrote, "British cinema was heavily dependent on the mysteries of Edgar Wallace in the early talkie era. Few of these creaky thrillers were ever remade, until someone at Gainsborough Productions felt the need to bring this veritable stage warhorse under starter's orders for a second time. It's all clipped accents and impossibly earnest hamming from the off...fans of Dick Francis may find it amusing." Halliwell's Film and Video Guide says it is a "very average racecourse melodrama", while Britmovie has described the film as a "tepid melodrama"; while

By July 1953, its net revenue was £93,000 a performance regarded by John Davis of Rank as "average".

References

External links

July 1948 review of film at Variety
The Calendar at Letterbx DVD
The Calendar at BFI
Complete original novel at Project Gutenberg

1948 films
1948 drama films
British black-and-white films
British drama films
British horse racing films
Films based on works by Edgar Wallace
Films directed by Arthur Crabtree
1940s English-language films
1940s British films